Žlne is a village in the municipality of Knjaževac, Serbia. According to the 2002 census, the village had a population of 161.

References

Populated places in Zaječar District